Afghanistan participated tn the 2010 Asian Para Games–First Asian Para Games in Guangzhou, China from 13 to 19 December 2010. Athletes from Afghanistan competed five events.

Participation details

Athletics

Cycling

Powerlifting

Swimming

Table tennis

References

Nations at the 2010 Asian Para Games
2010 in Afghan sport